SPE Strovolos Nicosia, also known as A.S.S. Spes is a Cypriot handball team located in Nicosia. They compete in the Cyprus National Handball League.

Titles 

Cyprus National Handball League
Winner (19): 1990, 1991, 1992, 1993, 1994, 1997, 1998, 1999, 2000, 2002, 2003, 2004, 2005, 2006, 2007, 2009, 2010, 2011, 2012, 2014
Cyprus Cup
Winner (18): 1991, 1992, 1993, 1994, 1997, 1998, 1999, 2000, 2002, 2003, 2004, 2005, 2006, 2008, 2009, 2010, 2011, 2012

European record

Team

Current squad 

Squad for the 2016–17 season

Goalkeepers
 Giannis Agroyiannis
 Michalis Kaili 
 Panayiotis Roussos

Wingers
RW
  Andreas Georgiou 
  Nearchos Michaelides
  Nektarios Stylianou
LW 
  Georgios Christodoulou
  Andreas Fotiou
  Nikolas Georgiou
Line players 
  Christos Chrysanthou

Back players
LB
  Andreas Ioannou
  Savvas Kasapis
CB 
  George Giorgallis
  Christoforos Tartios
  Marios Tseriotis 
  Savvas Zografos 
RB
  Georgios Loizou
  Soteris Prountzos
  Onoufrios Tzouvas

External links
 EHF Club Profile

Nicosia